Visa requirements for Jordanian citizens are administrative entry restrictions by the authorities of other states placed on citizens of Jordan. As of December 2022, Jordanian citizens had visa-free or visa on arrival access to 53 countries and territories, ranking the Jordanian passport 94th in terms of travel freedom according to the Henley Passport Index.

Visa requirements map

Visa requirements

Dependent, Disputed, or Restricted territories 
Visa requirements for Jordanian citizens for visits to various territories, disputed areas, partially recognized countries not mentioned in the list above, and restricted zones:

Non-visa restrictions

See also

Visa policy of Jordan
Jordanian passport

References and Notes
References

Notes

Jordan
Foreign relations of Jordan